Sânmiclăuș may refer to several places in Romania:

 Sânmiclăuș, a village in Șona Commune, Alba County
 Sânmiclăuș, a village in Moftin Commune, Satu Mare County
Sânmiclăuș (river), a tributary of the Ier in Satu Mare County